Harukiirario Koppu (コップ 晴紀イラリオ, Koppu Harukiirario, born 28 December 1998) is a Japanese water polo player. He competed in the 2020 Summer Olympics.

References

1998 births
Living people
Water polo players at the 2020 Summer Olympics
Japanese male water polo players
Olympic water polo players of Japan
Asian Games silver medalists for Japan
Asian Games medalists in water polo
Water polo players at the 2018 Asian Games
Medalists at the 2018 Asian Games
21st-century Japanese people